The Buckley-class destroyer escorts were 102 destroyer escorts launched in the United States in 1943–44. They served in World War II as convoy escorts and antisubmarine warfare ships. The ships had General Electric steam turbo-electric transmission. The ships were prefabricated at various factories in the United States, and the units brought together in the shipyards, where they were welded together on the slipways.

The Buckley class was the second class of destroyer escorts, succeeding the s. One of the main design differences was that the hull was significantly lengthened on the Buckley class; this long-hull design proved so successful that it was used for all further destroyer escort classes. The class was also known as the TE type, from Turbo Electric drive. The TE was replaced with a diesel-electric plant to yield the design of the successor  ("DET").

In total, 154 were ordered with six being completed as high-speed transport ("APD"). A further 37 were later converted after completion, while 46 of the Buckleys were delivered to the Royal Navy under the Lend-Lease agreement. These 46 were classed as frigates and named after Royal Navy captains of the Napoleonic Wars, forming part of the  along with 32 Lend-Lease ships of the Evarts class.

After World War II, most of the surviving units of this class were transferred to Taiwan, South Korea, Chile, Mexico, or other countries. The rest were retained by the US Navy's reserve fleet until they were decommissioned.

Armament
The Buckley-class' main armament was three 3-inch/50-caliber guns in Mk 22 dual-purpose open mounts.

For antiaircraft defense, the Buckley-class carried four 1.1 inch/75 (28mm) guns or two Bofors 40 mm L/60 guns fitted in the 'X' position. These were not included in the Captain-class units. Eight Oerlikon 20 mm cannons were positioned two in front of the bridge behind and above B gun mount, one on each side of the B gun mount in sponsons, and two on each side of the ship in sponsons just abaft the funnel. Some of the ships had extra Oerlikons fitted on top of the superstructure amidships. The Captain-class units had additional 20 mm guns fitted in 'X' position, and on the director stand for 'X' position.

For antisubmarine weapons, the Buckley class carried a Hedgehog, a British designed spigot mortar that fired 24 bombs ahead of the ship.  This was situated on the main deck just aft of 'A' mount. They also carried up to 200 depth charges. Two sets of double rails mounted on each side of the ship at the stern, each holding 24 charges and eight (two on Captain-class units) K-gun depth-charge throwers each holding five charges were on each side of the ship forward of the stern rails. On Captain-class ships, just forward of these, double sets of ready racks were fitted along each side of the ship extending to midships, each set holding 60 depth charges (these ready rails were added after the ships first arrived in the UK).

They also carried three  torpedo tubes in a triple mount mounted just aft of the stack.

Film appearance
The rest of the film is set in the submarine that it is hunting.

Ships in class

See also
 Escorteur
 List of frigates of World War II
 List of destroyer escorts of the United States Navy
 List of frigates of the United States Navy subset of above with hull numbers DE/FF 1037 and higher plus all DEG/FFGs because of the United States Navy 1975 ship reclassification
 List of frigate classes of the Royal Navy
 List of Captain-class frigates

References

External links

 http://www.desausa.org/ Destroyer Escort Sailors Association (DESA).
 USS Slater, the Destroyer Escort Historical Museum
 Captain-Class Frigates Association
 uboat.net: Destroyer Escorts
 destroyersonline.com: Buckley-class
 USS Slater  — Photos on board the destroyer escort USS Slater
 USS Bangust — Photos of life on board the destroyer escort USS Bangust (DE-739) in World War II
Destroyers Online - Buckley-class destroyer escorts

 
 
Frigate classes
Turbo-electric steamships